The Västmanlands Fotbollförbund (Västmanland Football Association) is one of the 24 district organisations of the Swedish Football Association. It administers lower tier and youth  football in the eastern half of the historical province of Västmanland, namely Västmanland County.

Background 

The Association was founded on 1 August 1938 and currently has 72 member clubs serving 12,000 players and officials. Based in Västerås, the Association's Chairman is Birger Jonsson.

The main goal of VFF is to promote, manage and develop football in Västmanland. From their district, several professional and international soccer players such as Stefan Pettersson, Pontus Kåmark, Gary Sundgren, Peter Markstedt, Fredrik Stenman, Jonny Rödlund, Åsa Jakobsson, Susanne Hedberg and Malin Flink.

Affiliated members 

The following clubs are affiliated to the Västmanlands FF:

Afghanska IF
Arboga Södra IF
Aros SK
Assyriska FC
Babylon FK
Bäckby IF
Barkarö SK
BK 30 DuFF
Bosnisk SK
Dingtuna GIF
Fagersta Södra IK
FC Europe Juniors
FC Sporting Västerås
Forsby FF
Gideonsbergs IF
Götlunda IF
Grällsta IF
Hallstahammars SK FK
Heds IF
Himmeta IF
IFK Arboga FK
IFK Ekberga
IFK Västerås FK
IK Franke
IK Oden
Irakiska IF
Irsta IF
Juventus IF
Kazakiska Kultur & IF
KFUM Malmabergs IK Västerås
Kolsva IF
Köping FF
Kungsör BK
Kurdiska FF
Kurdiska Sport Klubben
Los Condores KFF
Medåkers IF
Möklinta IF
Munktorps BK
Norberg-Högfors FK
Norrby IK
Norrby SK
Orresta IF
Ramnäs IF
Ransta IK
Riddarhytte SK
Romfartuna GIF
Rytterne IS
Sala FF
Sätra IF
Skiljebo SK
Skinnskattebergs SK
Skultuna IS
Sörstafors-Kolbäck FK
Surahammars FK
Syrianska IF Kerburan
Tillberga IK Fotboll
Tortuna SK
Tuna-Ekeby BK
Valskogs IK
Värhulta AIS
Västanfors IF FK
Västerås BK 30
Västerås FK
Västerås IK
Västerås SK FK
Västerås SK Ungdomsfotbollsklubb
Västerfärnebo AIK
Virsbo IF
Wahlsta SK
Wefors FF
Önsta BK

League Competitions 
Västmanlands FF run the following League Competitions:

Men's Football
Division 4  -  one section
Division 5  -  one section
Division 6  -  one section
Division 7  -  one section
Division 8  -  one section

Women's Football
Division 3  -  one section
Division 4  -  one section
Division 5  -  one section

Footnotes

External links 
 Västmanlands FF Official Website 

Västmanlands
Football in Västmanland County